James Putzel is a Professor of  Development Studies and Director of the Crisis States Research Centre at the LSE. He was educated at McGill and Oxford universities. His research focus has been on agrarian reform, social capital, political economy of development and crisis and fragile states.

He is perhaps best known for his book: A Captive Land: the Politics of Agrarian Reform in the Philippines.

Publications 
Putzel, James (1992) A Captive Land: the Politics of Agrarian Reform in the Philippines, London: Catholic Institute for International Relations; New York: Monthly Review Press

Putzel, James and Morales Jr, Horacio, eds. (2002) Power in the Village: Agrarian Reform, Rural Politics, Institutional Change and Globalisation. University of Philippines Press.

References 

Development specialists
Living people
McGill University alumni
Year of birth missing (living people)